Parkwood is a census-designated place (CDP) in Madera County, California, United States. It is part of the Madera Metropolitan Statistical Area. The population was 2,307 at the 2020 census.

Geography
It is bordered to the north by the city of Madera, the county seat.

Demographics

2010
The 2010 United States Census reported that Parkwood had a population of 2,268. The racial makeup of Parkwood was 1,138 (50.2%) White, 123 (5.4%) African American, 48 (2.1%) Native American, 22 (1.0%) Asian, 0 (0.0%) Pacific Islander, 814 (35.9%) from other races, and 123 (5.4%) from two or more races. Hispanic or Latino of any race were 1,784 persons (78.7%).

The Census reported that 2,259 people (99.6% of the population) lived in households, 9 (0.4%) lived in non-institutionalized group quarters, and 0 (0%) were institutionalized.

There were 564 households, out of which 317 (56.2%) had children under the age of 18 living in them, 295 (52.3%) were opposite-sex married couples living together, 130 (23.0%) had a female householder with no husband present, 53 (9.4%) had a male householder with no wife present.  There were 58 (10.3%) unmarried opposite-sex partnerships, and 5 (0.9%) same-sex married couples or partnerships. 61 households (10.8%) were made up of individuals, and 28 (5.0%) had someone living alone who was 65 years of age or older. The average household size was 4.01.  There were 478 families (84.8% of all households); the average family size was 4.24.

The population was spread out, with 793 people (35.0%) under the age of 18, 277 people (12.2%) aged 18 to 24, 592 people (26.1%) aged 25 to 44, 438 people (19.3%) aged 45 to 64, and 168 people (7.4%) who were 65 years of age or older.  The median age was 26.9 years. For every 100 females, there were 102.3 males.  For every 100 females age 18 and over, there were 96.9 males.

The homeowner vacancy rate was 1.6%; the rental vacancy rate was 7.1%.  1,175 people (51.8% of the population) lived in owner-occupied housing units and 1,084 people (47.8%) lived in rental housing units.

2000
As of the census of 2000, there were 2,119 people, 559 households, and 465 families residing in the CDP. The racial makeup of the CDP was 44.64% White, 5.33% African American, 1.98% Native American, 0.76% Asian, 0.05% Pacific Islander, 42.85% from other races, and 4.39% from two or more races. Hispanic or Latino of any race were 65.22% of the population.

There were 559 households, out of which 49.2% had children under the age of 18 living with them, 57.1% were married couples living together, 17.5% had a female householder with no husband present, and 16.8% were non-families. 13.1% of all households were made up of individuals, and 5.0% had someone living alone who was 65 years of age or older.  The average household size was 3.75 and the average family size was 4.09.

In the CDP, the population was spread out, with 37.1% under the age of 18, 11.6% from 18 to 24, 28.8% from 25 to 44, 15.9% from 45 to 64, and 6.6% who were 65 years of age or older.  The median age was 26 years. For every 100 females, there were 101.2 males.  For every 100 females age 18 and over, there were 97.2 males.

The median income for a household in the CDP was $34,018, and the median income for a family was $33,411. Males had a median income of $27,656 versus $24,167 for females. The per capita income for the CDP was $9,997.  About 19.0% of families and 22.3% of the population were below the poverty line, including 27.8% of those under age 18 and 7.8% of those age 65 or over.

Government

Infrastructure
In 2014 during the drought, Parkwood was one of 28 small California communities that cycled onto and off of a list of "critical water systems" that the State Water Resources Control Board determined could run dry within 60 days.

References

Census-designated places in Madera County, California
Census-designated places in California